The Oakland Athletics' 2005 season was their 37th in Oakland, California. It was also the 105th season in franchise history. The team finished second in the American League West with a record of 88-74.

The Athletics entered the 2005 season with low expectations. The team had won more than 90 games in each of the previous five seasons; despite this, there were concerns about the team's starting pitching. During the 2004–05 offseason, general manager Billy Beane traded two of the team's so-called "Big Three" starting pitchers. Beane traded two of the three, Tim Hudson and Mark Mulder, to the Atlanta Braves and St. Louis Cardinals (respectively); in both instances, he received prospects in return. The A's retained All-Star starter Barry Zito; despite this, many worried about the quality of the team's remaining starters. Some even picked the Athletics to finish last in the American League West, despite their having finished second (one game behind the Anaheim Angels) just months prior.

The A's seemed to validate these concerns in the early days of the 2005 season. On May 29, they were 17-32 (the third-worst record in baseball at the time); moreover, the team trailed the division-leading Angels by 12.5 games. The Athletics would follow this poor start with a stunning turnaround. From May 30 to August 13, Oakland would go a league-best 50-17. The surge was brought about, in large part, by the strong pitching of young starters Dan Haren (received in the Mulder trade), Rich Harden, and Joe Blanton. The team stunningly erased their 12.5 game deficit over this span. Oakland would pace the Angels well into September; at their peak, on August 30, the A's actually led the Angels by two games. In the end, though, the team fell short; a collapse in the second half of the 2005 season, combined with a dramatic Angels surge, saw the Athletics finish seven games out of first place.

The 2005 season also saw Athletics closer Huston Street win the American League Rookie of the Year Award. Street earned the honor after posting a 1.72 earned run average in his first major-league season; he did so while recording 23 saves. The Rookie of the Year Award was Oakland's second in as many years (and sixth overall).

Offseason
November 27, 2004: Jason Kendall was traded by the Pittsburgh Pirates with cash to the Oakland Athletics for Mark Redman, Arthur Rhodes, and cash.
December 16, 2004: Tim Hudson was traded by the Oakland Athletics to the Atlanta Braves for Juan Cruz, Dan Meyer, and Charles Thomas.
 December 18, 2004: Dan Haren was traded by the St. Louis Cardinals with Daric Barton and Kiko Calero to the Oakland Athletics for Mark Mulder.

Regular season

Season standings

Record vs. opponents

Transactions
 July 13, 2005: Eric Byrnes was traded by the Oakland Athletics with Omar Quintanilla to the Colorado Rockies for Joe Kennedy and Jay Witasick.

Roster

Player stats

Batting
Note: Pos = Position; G = Games played; AB = At bats; H = Hits; Avg. = Batting average; HR = Home runs; RBI = Runs batted in

Other batters
Note: G = Games played; AB = At bats; H = Hits; Avg. = Batting average; HR = Home runs; RBI = Runs batted in

Starting pitchers 
Note: G = Games pitched; IP = Innings pitched; W = Wins; L = Losses ERA = Earned run average; SO = Strikeouts

Other pitchers 
Note: G = Games pitched; IP = Innings pitched; W = Wins; L = Losses; ERA = Earned run average; SO = Strikeouts

Relief pitchers 
Note: G = Games pitched; W = Wins; L = Losses; SV = Saves; ERA = Earned run average; SO = Strikeouts

Farm system 

LEAGUE CHAMPIONS: Midland

References

2005 Oakland Athletics team page at Baseball Reference
2005 Oakland Athletics team page at www.baseball-almanac.com

Oakland Athletics seasons
Oakland Athletics Season, 2005
Oak